The 2016 RC Hotel Open was a professional tennis tournament played on hard courts. It was the first edition of the tournament which was part of the 2016 ATP Challenger Tour. It took place in Jönköping, Sweden between 7 and 13 March 2016.

Singles main-draw entrants

Seeds

1 Rankings as of February 29, 2016.

Other entrants
The following players received wildcards into the singles main draw:
  Isak Arvidsson
  Elliot Benchetrit
  Markus Eriksson
  Daniel Windahl

The following players received entry courtesy of a special exemption:
  Nikola Mektić

The following players received entry from the qualifying draw:
  Constant Lestienne
  Matwé Middelkoop
  Roberto Ortega-Olmedo
  Patrik Rosenholm

The following player received entry as a lucky loser:
  Evgeny Karlovskiy

Champions

Singles

  Andrey Golubev def.  Karen Khachanov, 6–7(9–11), 7–6(7–5), 7–6(7–4)

Doubles

  Isak Arvidsson /  Fred Simonsson def.  Markus Eriksson /  Milos Sekulic, 6–3, 3–6, [10–6]

External links
 Official website
Combined Main Draw

RC Hotel Open